R. Curt Webb (born October 25, 1949 in Lehi, Utah) is an American politician and a Republican member of the Utah House of Representatives representing District 5 since January 1, 2009. Webb was non-consecutively a member from his March 3, 2003 appointment to fill the vacancy caused by the resignation of Representative Brent Parker until 31 December 2004. He lives in Providence, UT, with his wife Michaele, and their three children: Nathan, David, and Suzanne.

Early life and career
Webb earned his BA in business management from Utah State University in 1986.

Political career
During the 2016 General Session, Representative Webb served on the Infrastructure and General Government Appropriations Subcommittee, the House Political Subdivisions Committee and the House Business and Labor Committee.

2016 sponsored legislation

Webb passed all of his three bills introduced during the 2016 General Session, giving him a 100% passage rate. He also floor sponsored SB0164S02 Local Government Modifications, SB0180 Optional Tax Increase Amendments, and SB0220S02 Non-judicial Foreclosure Amendments.

Elections
2014: Webb was unopposed in the Republican Primary and won the 2014 General election with 6,776 votes (79.68%) against Democratic nominee Jeffrey Turley.
2012: Webb was unopposed for the June 26, 2012 Republican Primary and won the November 6, 2012 General election with 11,946 votes (84.3%) against Democratic nominee Al Snyder.
2010: Webb was challenged in the June 22, 2010 Republican Primary but won with 2,252 votes (68.4%) and won the November 2, 2010 General election with 7,704 votes (83.7%) against Democratic nominee Paige Pagnucco.
2008: When Representative Wyatt left the Legislature and left the seat open, Webb was unopposed for the June 24, 2008 Republican Primary and won the November 4, 2008 General election with 10,245 votes (71.4%) against Democratic nominee Suzanne Marychild, who had been the Democratic nominee for the seat in 2006.
2004: Webb was challenged in the June 22, 2004 Republican Primary and lost by 60 votes to Scott L. Wyatt who was elected in the November 2, 2004 General election against Democratic challenger Victor Jensen.
2002: Webb challenged incumbent Republican Representative Brent Parker in the June 25, 2002 Republican Primary but lost by 90 votes to Representative Parker, who was re-elected in the November 5, 2002 General election against Democratic challenger Dennis Austin.

References

External links
Official page at the Utah State Legislature
Curt Webb at Ballotpedia
R. Curt Webb at OpenSecrets

1949 births
Living people
Republican Party members of the Utah House of Representatives
People from Lehi, Utah
Politicians from Logan, Utah
Utah State University alumni
21st-century American politicians